Bačkov may refer to:

Bačkov (Havlíčkův Brod District), village and municipality in the Vysočina Region of the Czech Republic
Bačkov, Trebišov District, village and municipality in Trebišov District, Slovakia

See also
Baczków (disambiguation)